Antonio 'Toni' Prats Cervera (born 9 September 1971) is a Spanish retired footballer who played as a goalkeeper.

In a career spent mainly with Betis, he appeared in 338 La Liga matches over 12 seasons (467 in 17 both major levels combined), winning one Copa del Rey with the club.

Club career
Prats was born in Capdepera, Majorca. After emerging through his hometown RCD Mallorca's youth system (appearing in one La Liga match in the 1991–92 season, a 1–2 home loss against Athletic Bilbao) and playing one year with RC Celta de Vigo, he finally settled at Seville's Real Betis, where he remained nine years. Ironically, in 1999–2000, as the Andalusians were relegated from the top flight, he scored against Atlético Madrid and Real Madrid through free kicks, in respectively a 2–1 win and 1–2 loss.

In 2005–06, Prats returned to Mallorca for a further two campaigns, before the emergence of Miguel Ángel Moyá forced a move to Segunda División club Hércules CF where he was scarcely used, retiring in March 2008 following recurrent back problems.

Honours

Club
Betis
Copa del Rey: 2004–05

International
Spain U21
UEFA European Under-21 Championship: Third-place 1994

References

External links

Betisweb stats and bio 

1971 births
Living people
Footballers from Mallorca
Spanish footballers
Association football goalkeepers
La Liga players
Segunda División players
Segunda División B players
RCD Mallorca B players
RCD Mallorca players
RC Celta de Vigo players
Real Betis players
Hércules CF players